The Baháʼí International Community, or the BIC, is an international non-governmental organization (NGO) representing the members of the Baháʼí Faith; it was first chartered in March 1948 with the United Nations, and currently has affiliates in over 180 countries and territories.

Hilda Yen was a founding and key figure in the establishment of the BIC according to Mildred Mottahedeh. Mottahedeh underscored Yen's service upon her death in 1970: "This noble lady played an important role in the development of the Baha'i Faith in the international field, and it was through her efforts that the Baha'is began their work with the United Nations", and wrote a memorial.

The BIC seeks to "promote world peace by creating the conditions in which unity emerges as the natural state of human existence" by promoting and applying principles which are derived from the teachings of the Baháʼí Faith to develop a united and sustainable civilization. The BIC also works on the advancement of human rights, the advancement of women, universal education, the encouragement of just economic development, the protection of the environment, and a sense of world citizenship.

To achieve its purpose, the BIC cooperates with governments, the United Nations and other inter-governmental and non-governmental organizations; in May 1970 it gained consultative status with the United Nations Economic and Social Council (ECOSOC) and in 1976 with the United Nations Children's Fund (UNICEF). Then in 1989 the BIC developed a working relationship with the World Health Organization, and it also has a working relationship with various other United Nations agencies and enterprises including the UN Development Fund for Women (UNIFEM) and United Nations Environment Programme (UNEP). The BIC has also undertaken joint development programs with various other United Nations agencies; in the 2000 Millennium Forum of the United Nations a Baháʼí was invited as the only non-governmental speaker during the summit.

The Baháʼí International Community has offices at the United Nations in New York and Geneva and representations to United Nations regional commissions and other offices in Addis Ababa, Bangkok, Nairobi, Rome, Santiago, and Vienna. In recent years an Office of the Environment and an Office for the Advancement of Women were established as part of its United Nations Office. There also exists an Office of Public Information which is based at the Baháʼí World Centre in Haifa, Israel; that office distributes information about the Baháʼí Faith and publishes One Country, a quarterly newsletter.

On 4 March 2009, the Baháʼí International Community released an open letter to Iran's Chief Prosecutor, Ayatollah Qorban-Ali Dorri-Najafabadi, addressing his statements regarding the administrative affairs of the Baháʼís of Iran.

See also
 Baháʼí Faith
 Internationalism (politics)

References

External links
 Baháʼí International Community, official website
 Statements and publications of the BIC
 Baháʼí World News Service, news stories and press releases by the BIC Office of Public Information
 One Country, quarterly newsletter
 Baha'i International Community and International Organizations
 
 

Bahá'í institutions
Global policy organizations